Maurice Kennedy may refer to:

 Maurice Kennedy (politician) (1884–1939), Australian politician
 Maurice Kennedy (rugby league) (born 1988), Fijian rugby league footballer